Willie Waugh (2 February 1910 – 1970) was a Scottish footballer, who played as a goalkeeper, primarily for Heart of Midlothian, although he played almost as many Scottish Football League matches for Third Lanark on a three-year loan, which included winning the 1930–31 Scottish Division Two title.

Waugh was one of two players loaned by Hearts to their Edinburgh derby rivals Hibernian in 1936, which helped Hibs avoid relegation from 1935–36 Scottish Division One. After returning to Tynecastle Park, Waugh was first-choice goalkeeper as Hearts secured runners-up spot in the 1937–38 Scottish Division One season, their highest finish in 23 years.

He won one cap for Scotland in December 1937, playing in a 5–0 win against Czechoslovakia in a friendly.

References

1910 births
1970 deaths
Association football goalkeepers
Scottish footballers
Heart of Midlothian F.C. players
Third Lanark A.C. players
Hibernian F.C. players
Albion Rovers F.C. wartime guest players
Scotland international footballers
Scottish Football League players
Sportspeople from Livingston, West Lothian
Footballers from West Lothian